Lisa Lung (born 29 June 1999) is a Belgian table tennis player. Her highest career ITTF ranking was 110.

References

1999 births
Living people
Belgian female table tennis players